Harpactocrates is a genus of  woodlouse hunting spiders that was first described by Eugène Simon in 1914.

Species
 it contains thirteen species:
Harpactocrates apennicola Simon, 1914 – France, Italy
Harpactocrates cazorlensis Ferrández, 1986 – Spain
Harpactocrates drassoides (Simon, 1882) (type) – Western Europe
Harpactocrates escuderoi Ferrández, 1986 – Spain
Harpactocrates globifer Ferrández, 1986 – Spain
Harpactocrates gredensis Ferrández, 1986 – Spain
Harpactocrates gurdus Simon, 1914 – Spain, France
Harpactocrates intermedius Dalmas, 1915 – France, Italy
Harpactocrates meridionalis Ferrández & Martin, 1986 – Spain
Harpactocrates radulifer Simon, 1914 – Spain, France
Harpactocrates ravastellus Simon, 1914 – Spain, France
Harpactocrates trialetiensis Mcheidze, 1997 – Georgia
Harpactocrates troglophilus Brignoli, 1978 – Turkey

References

Araneomorphae genera
Dysderidae
Taxa named by Eugène Simon